Rampur Karkhana is a town and a nagar panchayat in Deoria district in the Indian state of Uttar Pradesh.

Demographics
 India census, Rampur Karkhana had a population of 9598. Males constitute 52% of the population and females 48%. Rampur Karkhana has an average literacy rate of 75%, : male literacy is 82%, and female literacy is 73%. In Rampur Karkhana, 19% of the population is under 6 years of age.

Sirsia No. 400-500 meters from Rampur factory. There is 1 village where Sardar Patel Girls Inter College is there along with very big field. In this village there are Mallavishen, Mahatakshatriya, Dasgaurrajput, Thakurairghuvanshi from Kshatriya-Rajput Sahastravar-Sangh in Sirsia No. 1 And the best and most important thing about this village is that a trust has been formed for the benefit of every small and big community in the name of Student Club Sirsia, it is the aim of all student club workers to help others.

References

Cities and towns in Deoria district